The Milwaukee Leader was a socialist daily newspaper established in Milwaukee, Wisconsin in December 1911 by Socialist Party leader Victor L. Berger. The paper continued in operation until January 1939, when it was succeeded by the Milwaukee Evening Post.

History

Establishment

The Milwaukee Leader was established on December 7, 1911, by a holding company called the Social Democratic Publishing Company. Stock was owned jointly by unions, branches of the Socialist Party, and individual participants in the labor and radical movement. Critical additional funding was provided by Elizabeth H. Thomas, a wealthy Milwaukee resident of radical political views. Editor-in-Chief from the paper's founding was Victor L. Berger, best known as the first Socialist member of the United States Congress. Other important editorialists over the paper's history included James R. "Jim" Howe (who died in the spring of 1917), his successor John M. Work, and international affairs commentator Ernest Untermann.

World War I problems

During World War I, the paper's consistent antimilitarist stand brought it into conflict with the administration of President Woodrow Wilson and his Postmaster General Albert Burleson. The Leader'''s second class mailing privileges were withdrawn in October 1917 and the publication was banned from the United States mails, eliminating about 14,000 subscribers with one blow. In August 1918 the publication was deprived of the right to receive first class mail, with all letters from subscribers and readers sent to the publication summarily returned to sender with the envelope stamped "Mail to This Address Undeliverable Under Espionage Act." The paper was twice raided by the U.S. Department of Justice and subscriber records were seized.

Editor-in-Chief Victor L. Berger was indicted and convicted under the Espionage Act and sentenced to 20 years in prison (a sentence subsequently overturned on appeal). The paper managed to survive only through carrier delivery in Milwaukee and its environs, with the paper regaining its mailing privileges only in June 1921, over two and a half years after the armistice which ended the world war. The paper survived this onslaught without skipping an issue and by 1923 had nearly 50,000 subscribers on its rolls.

Sale and name changes

Suffering financially, the Leader was sold on in March 1938 to Paul Holmes. Although no immediate changes were taken in the paper's editorial stance, editorialist John Work later recalled "for a little while I could write socialist editorials, but it soon appeared that, while I could write socialist editorials, I was expected not to make much use of the word 'socialism.' I stayed on, knowing that I could still do some good work for the cause, and not knowing but that the socialists might again get control of the paper."

The new owners formed a new holding company for the paper called the Wisconsin Guardian Publishing Company. In April 1938 the name of the paper was changed from the Milwaukee Leader to the New Milwaukee Leader.In January 1939, seeking to further distance the faltering publication from its socialist past and to bring in as many new readers as possible of a recently terminated Hearst newspaper, the name of the New Milwaukee Leader was changed again, this time to the Milwaukee Evening Post.In the spring of 1939, new owner Paul Holmes and his associates sold their interest in the Wisconsin Guardian Publishing Company to representatives of the Milwaukee Federated Trades Council, and the unions took over the paper. The paper continued to languish.

By July 1940, the Milwaukee unions had enough of the faltering daily and made an arrangement for the paper's employees to run it. The name of the paper was changed yet again that September, this time to the Milwaukee Post.The complete run of the Milwaukee Leader is available on microfilm from the Wisconsin Historical Society.

Footnotes

Further reading

 Zechariah Chafee, Jr.,  "The Milwaukee Leader Case," The Nation, vol. 112 (March 23, 1921), pp. 428–429.
 Leslie Cross, "The Milwaukee Leader: An Unusual Newspaper." Historical Messenger [Milwaukee], vol. 17 (December 1961), pp. 11–16.
 Sally M. Miller, Victor Berger and the Promise of Constructive Socialism, 1910-1920. Westport, CT: Greenwood Press, 1973.

See also

 Social-Democratic Party of Wisconsin
 New York Call''

Socialist newspapers published in the United States
Socialist Party of America publications
History of Milwaukee
Defunct newspapers published in Wisconsin
Newspapers established in 1911
1939 disestablishments in Wisconsin
1911 establishments in Wisconsin
Publications disestablished in 1939